Michael II (770–829), called the Amorian and the Stammerer (ho Travlós or , ho Psellós), reigned as Byzantine Emperor from 25 December 820 to his death on 2 October 829, the first ruler of the Amorian dynasty.

Born in Amorium, Michael was a soldier, rising to high rank along with his colleague Leo V the Armenian ( 813–820). He helped Leo overthrow and take the place of Emperor Michael I Rangabe. However, after they fell out Leo sentenced Michael to death. Michael then masterminded a conspiracy which resulted in Leo's assassination at Christmas in 820. Immediately he faced the long revolt of Thomas the Slav, which almost cost him his throne and was not completely quelled until spring 824. The later years of his reign were marked by two major military disasters that had long-term effects: the beginning of the Muslim conquest of Sicily, and the loss of Crete to the Saracens. Domestically, he supported and strengthened the resumption of official iconoclasm, which had begun again under Leo V.

Early life

Michael was born in 770 in Amorium, in Phrygia, into a Cappadocian-Jewish family of professional peasant-soldiers who received land from the government for their military service. A Syrian source declares that Michael II was of Jewish birth. His family belonged to the Judeo-Christian sect of the Athinganoi, whose members had adopted the Jewish faith and rituals. The Athinganoi were numerous in Anatolia and the Balkans and together with the early  Serbians, other citizens in Balkans and Armenians formed the backbone of the Byzantine army of that era.

Michael first rose to prominence as a close aide (spatharios) to the general Bardanes Tourkos, alongside his future antagonists Leo the Armenian and Thomas the Slav. He married Bardanes' daughter Thekla, while Leo married another daughter. Michael and Leo abandoned Bardanes shortly after he rebelled against Emperor Nikephoros I in 803, and they were rewarded with higher military commands: Michael was named the Emperor's Count of the Tent. Michael was instrumental in Leo's overthrow of Michael I Rangabe in 813, after Rangabe's repeated military defeats against the Bulgarians. Under Leo V, Michael was appointed to command the elite tagma of the Excubitors.

He became disgruntled with Leo V, however, when the Emperor divorced Michael's sister-in-law. On Christmas Eve 820, Leo V accused him of conspiracy, jailed him, and sentenced him to death, although he postponed the execution until after Christmas. Michael sent messages to his co-conspirators threatening to reveal their identity, whereupon his partisans freed him and murdered Leo V during the Christmas mass in the palace chapel of St. Stephen.

Reign
Michael was immediately proclaimed Emperor, while still wearing prison chains on his legs. Later the same day, he was crowned by patriarch Theodotus I of Constantinople. In his internal policy, Michael II supported iconoclasm, but he tacitly encouraged reconciliation with the iconodules, whom he generally stopped persecuting and allowed to return from exile. These included the former patriarch Nikephoros and Theodore of Stoudios, who failed, however, to persuade the emperor to abandon iconoclasm. One of the few victims of the Emperor's policy was the future patriarch Methodios I.

Michael's accession whetted the appetite of his former comrade-in-arms Thomas the Slav, who set himself up as rival emperor in Anatolia and successfully transferred his forces into Thrace, effectively besieging the capital in December 821. Although Thomas did not win over all the Anatolian themes, he secured the support of the naval theme and their ships, allowing him to tighten his grip on Constantinople. In his quest for support, Thomas presented himself as a champion of the poor, reduced taxation, and concluded an alliance with Al-Ma'mun of the Abbasid Caliphate, having himself crowned Emperor by the Patriarch of Antioch Job.

With the support of Omurtag of Bulgaria, Michael II forced Thomas to lift his siege of Constantinople in the spring of 823. Michael besieged Thomas in Arcadiopolis and forced his surrender in October. 

Michael inherited a seriously weakened military and was unable to prevent the conquest of Crete in 824 by 10,000 Arabs (who had 40 ships), or to recover the island with an expedition in 826. In 827 the Arabs also invaded Sicily, taking advantage of local infighting, and besieged Syracuse.

Thekla and Michael had only one known son, the Emperor Theophilos (813 – 20 January 842). The existence of a daughter called Helena is possible but there is a contradiction between different sources. Helena is known as the wife of Theophobos, a patrician executed in 842 for conspiring to gain the throne for himself. George Hamartolos and Theophanes report him marrying the sister of the Empress Theodora. Joseph Genesius records Theophobos marrying the sister of the Emperor Theophilos. Whether Helena was sister or sister-in-law to Theophilos is thus unclear.

After the death of Thekla, in  823, Michael II married Euphrosyne, a daughter of Constantine VI and Maria of Amnia. This marriage was probably intended to strengthen Michael's position as Emperor, but it incurred the opposition of the clergy, as Euphrosyne had previously become a nun. Michael II died on 2 October 829 from kidney failure.

Because of his Judeo-Christian origin and iconoclasm, Michael II was not popular among Orthodox clergy, who depicted him as an ignorant and poorly educated peasant, but Michael II was a competent statesman and administrator. Though the civil war his accession precipitated gravely weakened the imperial government, by the end of his reign he had begun a restoration of the Byzantine military. The system of government and military built by Michael II enabled the Empire under his grandson Michael III to gain the ascendancy in their struggles with the Abbasids and to withstand all the vicissitudes of Byzantine palace life. Michael II's direct descendants, the Amorian dynasty followed by the so-called Macedonian dynasty, ruled the Empire for more than two centuries, inaugurating the Byzantine Renaissance of the 9th and 10th centuries.

See also

List of Byzantine emperors

Footnotes

References
.

9th-century Byzantine emperors
Phrygian dynasty
Byzantine Jews
770 births
829 deaths
Byzantine Iconoclasm
People from Amorium
Protostratores
810s in the Byzantine Empire
820s in the Byzantine Empire